TFG Limited, also known as The Foschini Group, is a South African JSE listed retail clothing group, which trades under various brands and has more than 3,000 stores within its portfolio. It is headquartered in Parow East near Cape Town.

In 2015, the company acquired the British apparel chain Phase Eight from TowerBrook Capital Partners, then valued at £300 million.

In March 2016, TFG acquired the British chain Whistles with its 46 retail shops. In 2017, the company acquired Australian retail company Retail Apparel Group from Navis Capital Partners.

In March 2020, TFG announced that, during the on-going COVID-19 pandemic, the company would cease to pay rents for its retail locations during the resultant lockdowns in South Africa.

During the course of 2020, TFG acquired the chain of Jet stores from an ailing Edcon, further expanding their footprint as a retail conglomerate.

On 5 October 2021, it was reported that TymeBank would open approximately 600 banking service kiosks in TFG retail outlets in 2022.

Through a series of investments, TFG has increased its manufacturing capacity in South Africa. By November 2021, it was producing almost three quarters of its apparel locally.

References

External links

Clothing companies of South Africa
Companies based in Cape Town